The Highland is a Scottish breed of rustic beef cattle. It originated in the Scottish Highlands and the Western Islands of Scotland and has long horns and a long shaggy coat. It is a hardy breed, able to withstand the intemperate conditions in the region. The first herd-book dates from 1885; two types – a smaller island type, usually black, and a larger mainland type, usually dun – were registered as a single breed. It is reared primarily for beef, and has been exported to several other countries.

History 

The Highland is a traditional breed of western Scotland. There were two distinct types. The Kyloe, reared mainly in the Hebrides or Western Islands, was small and was frequently black. The cattle were so called because of the practice of swimming them across the narrow straits or kyles separating the islands from the mainland. The cattle of the mainland were somewhat larger, and very variable in colour; they were often brown or red.

These cattle were important to the Scottish economy of the eighteenth century. At markets such as those of Falkirk or Crieff, many were bought by drovers from England, who moved them south over the Pennines to be fattened for slaughter. In 1723 over  Scottish cattle were sold into England.

A breed society was established in 1884, and in 1885 published the first volume of the herd-book. In this the two types were recorded without distinction as 'Highland'.

The number of unregistered cattle is not known. 

Although a group of cattle is generally called a herd, a group of Highland cattle is known as a "fold". This is because in winter, the cattle were kept in open shelters made of stone called folds to protect them from the weather at night. 

In 1954, Queen Elizabeth II ordered Highland cattle to be kept at Balmoral Castle where they are still kept today.

From the late nineteenth century, stock was exported to various countries of the world, among them Argentina, Australia, Canada, the Falkland Islands, the former Soviet Union and the United States. Later in the twentieth century there were exports to various European countries. In 2022 the breed was reported to DAD-IS by twenty-three countries, of which seventeen reported population data.

Australia 
Highland cattle were first imported into Australia by the mid-nineteenth century by Scottish migrants such as Chieftain Aeneas Ronaldson MacDonell of Glengarry, Scotland. Arriving in Port Albert, Victoria, in 1841 with his clan, they apparently drove their Highland cattle to a farm at Greenmount, on the Tarra River, preceded by a piper. Samuel Amess, also from Scotland, who made a fortune in the Victorian goldfields and became Mayor of Melbourne in 1869, kept a small fold of black Highland cattle on Churchill Island. This fold (of now mainly dun cattle) is reputed to be the largest outside Scotland. They were seen and survived in Port Victoria during the late 1800s, but other folds were believed to have died out in areas such as New South Wales. In 1988 the Australian Highland Cattle Society was formed. Since then, numbers have been growing and semen is being exported to New Zealand to establish the breed there.

Canada 
Highland cattle were first imported into Canada in the 1880s. The Hon. Donald A. Smith, Lord Strathcona of Winnipeg, Manitoba, and Robert Campbell of Strathclair, Manitoba, imported one bull each. There were also Highland cattle in Nova Scotia in the 1880s. However, their numbers were small until the 1920s when large-scale breeding and importing began. In the 1950s cattle were imported from and exported to North America. The Canadian Highland Cattle Society was officially registered in 1964 and currently registers all purebred cattle in Canada. Towards the end of the 1990s, there was a large semen and embryo trade between the UK and Canada. However that has stopped, largely due to the BSE (mad cow disease) outbreaks in the United Kingdom. Today, Highland cattle are mainly found in eastern Canada.

Denmark 

The Danish Highland Cattle Society was established in 1987 to promote the best practices for the breeding and care of Highland cattle and to promote the introduction of the breed into Denmark.

Finland 

The Highland Cattle Club of Finland was founded in 1997. Their studbooks show importation of Highland cattle breeding stock to Finland, dating back to 1884. The Finnish club states that in 2016, there were  Highland cattle in Finland.

United States 

The first record of Highland cattle being imported to the United States was in the late 1890s. The American Highland Cattle Association was first organised in 1948 as the American Scotch Highland Breeders Association, and now claims approximately  members.

Characteristics 

They have long, wide horns and long, wavy, woolly coats. The usual coat colour is reddish brown, seen in approximately 60% of the population; some 22% are yellow, and the remainder pale silver, black or brindle/dun. The coat colours are caused by alleles at the MC1R gene (E locus) and the PMEL or SILV gene (D locus).

They have an unusual double coat of hair. On the outside is the oily outer hair—the longest of any cattle breed, covering a downy undercoat. This makes them well suited to conditions in the Highlands, which have a high annual rainfall and sometimes very strong winds.

Mating occurs throughout the year with a gestation period of approximately  days. Most commonly a single calf is born, but twins are not unknown. Sexual maturity is reached at about eighteen months. Highland cattle also have a longer expected lifespan than most other breeds of cattle, up to 20 years.

Cold tolerance
All European cattle cope relatively well with low temperatures but Highland cattle have been described as "almost as cold-tolerant as the arctic-dwelling caribou and reindeer". Conversely due to their thick coats they are much less tolerant of heat than zebu cattle, which originated in South Asia and are adapted for hot climates. Highland cattle have been successfully established in countries where winters are substantially colder than Scotland such as Norway and Canada.

Social behaviour
A fold of semi-wild Highland cattle was studied over a period of 4 years. It was found that the cattle have a clear structure and hierarchy of dominance, which reduces aggression. Social standing depends on age and sex, with older cattle being dominant to calves and younger ones, and males dominant to females. Young bulls will dominate adult cows when they reached around 2 years of age. Calves from the top ranking cow were given higher social status, despite minimal intervention from their mother. Playfighting, licking and mounting were seen as friendly contact.

Breeding occurred in May and June, with heifers first giving birth at 2–3 years old.

Use 
The meat of Highland cattle tends to be leaner than most beef because Highlands are largely insulated by their thick, shaggy hair rather than by subcutaneous fat. Highland cattle can produce beef at a reasonable profit from land that would otherwise normally be unsuitable for agriculture. The most profitable way to produce Highland beef is on poor pasture in their native land, the Highlands of Scotland.

Commercial success 
The beef from Highland cattle is very tender, but the market for high-quality meat has declined. To address this decline, it is common practice to breed Highland "suckler" cows with a more favourable breed such as a Shorthorn or Limousin bull. This allows the Highland cattle to produce a crossbred beef calf that has the tender beef of its mother on a carcass shape of more commercial value at slaughter. These crossbred beef suckler cows inherit the hardiness, thrift and mothering capabilities of their Highland dams and the improved carcass configuration of their sires. Such crossbred sucklers can be further crossbred with a modern beef bull such as a Limousin or Charolais to produce high quality beef.

See also 
 List of domesticated Scottish breeds

References 

Cattle breeds
Cattle breeds originating in Scotland
Highland (council area)
Conservation Priority Breeds of the Livestock Conservancy